The Snæfell women's basketball team, commonly known as Snæfell, is the women's basketball department of Ungmennafélagið Snæfell, based in Stykkishólmur, Iceland.

History
Snæfell's women's team first played in Úrvalsdeild kvenna during the 2008–09 season after winning Division I the previous season with a perfect record. It won the national championship for three straight seasons, from 2014 to 2016, and the Icelandic Basketball Cup in 2016. They furthermore won the Supercup in 2012 and from 2014 to 2016. On 2 June 2021, the club announced that it would not take its seat in the Úrvalsdeild for the 2021–22 season and register it in the second-tier 1. deild kvenna.

Season by season

Trophies and awards

Trophies
 Úrvalsdeild kvenna:
 Winners (3): 2014, 2015, 2016.
 Runners-up (1): 2017

 Icelandic Basketball Cup (1):
 Winners (1): 2016
 Runners-up (2): 2012, 2014

 Icelandic Super Cup:
 Winners (4): 2012, 2014, 2015, 2016

 Icelandic Company Cup (1):
 Winners (1): 2012

 1. deild kvenna:
 Winners (1): 2008

Awards
Úrvalsdeild kvenna Domestic Player of the Year
 Hildur Sigurðardóttir – 2014, 2015

Úrvalsdeild kvenna Foreign Player of the Year
 Haiden Denise Palmer – 2016
 Kristen McCarthy – 2015

Úrvalsdeild kvenna Domestic All-First Team
 Berglind Gunnarsdóttir – 2017
 Bryndís Guðmundsdóttir – 2016
 Gunnhildur Gunnarsdóttir – 2015, 2016
 Hildur Sigurðardóttir – 2012, 2013, 2014, 2015
 Hildur Björg Kjartansdóttir – 2013, 2014

Úrvalsdeild kvenna Defensive Player of the Year
 Guðrún Gróa Þorsteinsdóttir – 2015
 Gunnhildur Gunnarsdóttir – 2015, 2016

Úrvalsdeild kvenna Coach of the Year
 Ingi Þór Steinþórsson – 2014, 2015, 2016

Notable players

Coaches
 Justin Shouse 
 Högni Högnason 
 Ingi Þór Steinþórsson 
 Baldur Þorleifsson 
 Gunnlaugur Smárason 
 Halldór Steingrímsson

References

External links
Official Website  
Eurobasket team profile
KKÍ: Stjarnan – kki.is  

Snæfell (basketball)